This is the list of universities, colleges and institutes in Saudi Arabia.

By province

See also 
 List of technical colleges in Saudi Arabia

References

Ministry of Education, Saudi Arabia
https://www.moe.gov.sa/en/HigherEducation/governmenthighereducation/StateUniversities/Pages/Introduction.aspx

External links

 List of Universities in Saudi Arabia
 Top Colleges And Universities in Saudi Arabia

Saudi Arabia education-related lists
Saudi Arabia
Saudi Arabia